Switzerland competed at the Eurovision Song Contest 1991, held in Rome, Italy. The Swiss entry was Sandra Simó with the Italian song "Canzone per te", composed by Renato Mascetti.

Before Eurovision

National final 
The final was held on 23 February 1991 at the Casino du Rivage in Vevey, hosted by Lolita Morena. The winner was decided by the votes of 3 regional juries, a press jury and an expert jury.

At Eurovision
Simó performed 5th on the night of the contest, following Greece and preceding Austria. At the close of the voting the song had received 118 points, placing 5th of 22.

The Swiss conductor at the contest was Flaviano Cuffari.

Voting

References

External links
Swiss National Final 1991

1991
Countries in the Eurovision Song Contest 1991
Eurovision